Rebecca Ann Pavan (born ) is a Canadian retired female volleyball player. She was a member of the Canada women's national volleyball team and played for MKS Dąbrowa Górnicza in 2016. She was part of the Canadian national team at the 2014 FIVB Volleyball Women's World Championship in Italy. Pavan played collegiate volleyball at the University of Kentucky. Her older sister is fellow volleyball player Sarah Pavan.

References

1990 births
Living people
Canadian women's volleyball players
Opposite hitters
Sportspeople from Kitchener, Ontario
Expatriate volleyball players in Germany
Expatriate volleyball players in France
Expatriate volleyball players in Poland
Expatriate volleyball players in the United States
Kentucky Wildcats women's volleyball players
Canadian expatriate sportspeople in Germany
Canadian expatriate sportspeople in France
Canadian expatriate sportspeople in Poland
Canadian expatriate sportspeople in the United States